Acianthera panduripetala is a species of orchid.

panduripetala